Noémia Delgado (7 June 1933 – 2 March 2016) was a Portuguese television and film screenwriter, film editor and director.

Background
She was the daughter of Luís Delgado (21 August 1900 – 8 December 1986) and wife Judite da Conceição de Freitas.

Marriage and child
On 27 December 1957 she married writer and poet Alexandre O'Neill; they divorced on 15 January 1971. The couple had a son:

 Alexandre Delgado O'Neill (Lisbon, 23 December 1959 – Lisbon, Portugal, 4 January 1993), a photographer, unmarried and without issue

Filmography
 Mudar de Vida (1966) Film editor
 The Pearl of the Atlantic (1969) Assistant Film Editor
 Sever do Vouga... Uma Experiência (1971) Film editor
 O Passado e o Presente (1972) Assistant Film Editor
 A Pousada das Chagas (1972) Film editor
 Meus Amigos (1974) Film editor
 Torre Bela aka Cooperativa Agrícola Torre Bela or Cooperativa Torre Bela (Portugal: TV title) (1975) (TV) Television editor
 Máscaras (1976) Film director
 Deus, Pátria e Autoridade (1976) Collaborator
 A Princesinha das Rosas (1981) (TV) Television writer, Production sound mixer, Television editor and Television director
 Tiaga (1981) (TV) Television writer, Television editor and Television director
 O Defunto (1981) (TV) Television writer, Television editor and Television director
 O Canto da Sereia (1983) (TV) Television writer, Television editor and Television director
 A Noite de Walpurgis (1983) (TV) Television writer, Television editor and Television director
 A Estranha Morte do Professor Antena (1983) (TV) Television writer, Television editor, Production manager and Television director
 Quem Foste, Alvarez? (1988)

References

External links
 Noémia Delgado's Genealogy in a Portuguese Genealogical site

1933 births
2016 deaths
Portuguese film directors
Portuguese women film directors
Portuguese television directors
Women television directors